The Pass of Drumochter meaning simply 'high ridge' is the main mountain pass between the northern and southern central Scottish Highlands. The A9 road passes through here, as does the Highland Main Line, the railway between Inverness and the south of Scotland. The Sustrans National Cycle Route 7 between Glasgow and Inverness also runs through the pass.

The pass is the only gap in the main Grampian Watershed suitable for road traffic routes for almost 100 km, between Glen Coe (west) and Cairnwell (east); the West Highland Railway is the only other crossing, at Corrour. The gap has been shaped into a "U" convenient for a transport corridor by glacial action over successive ice ages, although Loch Ericht just to the west is a much larger glacial breach 

The route through the pass has been used since prehistoric times. A military road built between 1728 and 1730 by General Wade came through here.

It is the high point on the A9, at 460 m (1508 ft), and in winter can be subject to severe weather conditions. There are routine winter patrols from November to March, and the road is occasionally closed with snow gates near Dalwhinnie and Dalnacardoch. The summit of the railway line is 452 m (1480 ft), making it the highest in the UK. It has been used by the RAF as a training route for low level flying, now less frequently.

The summit of the pass marks the boundary between Perth and Kinross and the Highland Council area. A sign at this point says "Welcome to the Highlands/Fàilte don Ghàidhealtachd", although this is the boundary for the authority rather than for the Scottish Highlands which extend south to the geological Highland Boundary Fault at Dunkeld.

References

External links

 Image of Railway Summit Sign

Drumochter
Roads in Scotland
Badenoch and Strathspey
Landforms of Perth and Kinross
Railway inclines in the United Kingdom